Helen: The Life and Times of an H-Bomb is a 2006 book written by Jerry Pinto and based on Bollywood actress and dancer Helen. It was received positively by critics and won the 2006 National Film Award for Best Book on Cinema.

References

2006 non-fiction books
Indian biographies
Books about actors
21st-century Indian books
Best Book on Cinema National Film Award winners